Matsuichthys aequipinnis is a species of tubeshoulder found only in the Sulu Sea. This species grows to a length of  SL.

References
 

Platytroctidae
Fish of the Pacific Ocean
Monotypic ray-finned fish genera
Fish described in 1992